Gladys Del Carmen Brandao Amaya (born March 27, 1991) is a Panamanian actress, TV host, model and beauty pageant titleholder who was crowned Miss Panamá 2015 and represented Panama at the Miss Universe 2015 pageant.

Brandao was crowned Miss Panamá 2015 representing Los Santos, becoming the eighth woman from the province of Los Santos to win the title. As Miss Panama 2015, Brandao competed at the Miss Universe 2015 pageant in the US but didn't place.

See also
 Miss Panamá 2015

References

External links
 Miss Panama Official Web Page

Panamanian female models
Miss Universe 2015 contestants
1991 births
Living people
Panamanian beauty pageant winners
Señorita Panamá